Robert Light is a British civil servant and former Conservative Party politician who served as Leader of Kirklees Council between 2006 and 2009, and as a councillor for Birstall and Birkenshaw ward on Kirklees Council for over eighteen years between 2000 and 2018. Light also served as the first Chair of the Leeds City Region.

Light is currently the Head Commissioner for the Independent Commission on Civil Aviation Noise, and the Chair of the Consumer Council for Water.

Sources

Conservative Party (UK) councillors
Living people
Year of birth missing (living people)
Councillors in Kirklees